Labuschagne or Labuschagné is a surname often used by Afrikaners or people of Afrikaner descent. Notable people with the surname include:

 Cathlene Labuschagne, South African politician
 Jannes Labuschagne (born 1976), South African rugby union player
 Lappies Labuschagné, known as Pieter Labuschagné (born 1989), South African-born Japanese international rugby union footballer
 Leon Labuschagne, South African paralympic athlete
 Marnus Labuschagne (born 1994), South African born Australian cricketer

Early Huguenot origins 
La Buscagne, 47600 Moncrabeau, France - The surname "Labuscagne" is derived from the town (village) "Labuscagne" (or "La Buscagne"), where they've originally stayed.

Abram (Habran/Habrant) Labuscagne is the oldest known French ancestor of all South African Labuschagnes, Labuscagnes and Labuscaignes.  
It is almost certain that Abram Labuscagne was born on the farm "Pontacq" close to the town, Escassefort (50 km south from Bergerac), which his parents hired from the noble Pontac family. It is believed that Abram's grandson, Pierre, has named his farm, Pontacq, in Paarl in South Africa after this farm. During the religious war (during 1621-1629) in that area, Abram, his brother Isaac and his sister, Suzanne,  have fled in 1629 and found a safe haven in the more northern town of Monbazillac, at the Monbazillac Castle, near Bergerac in France. It is unknown what happened with their parents and other family members.

Little is known about Abram. What we do know is that he was an elder of the local Protestant Church in the Colombier district at the Monbazillac Castle - a few kilometers south of Bergerac on the Dordogne River.  Abram was married in ± 1636 to Jeanne Artieu, whose family had already settled in Monbazillac. They had three sons: Jean (christened on 10 May 1637 in Montbazillac), Isaac (christened on 23 Jun 1641 in Montbazillac) and Estienne (± 1643), the two uncles and the father of the South African ancestor, Pierre. They were all born in Monbazillac, where Abram worked as a dressmaker in the service of the castle lord. There they grew up and learned the subject of tailoring from their father Abram, but later settled in the town of Bergerac as tailors.
Isaac married Anne DUQUEYLA and Estienne married Suzanne Fredet on 17 March 1664.

As Protestants the family suffered heavy religious persecution for a long time. At least two family members attempted to escape France. One, Samson Labuscaigne was captured and sentenced to life imprisonment as a galley slave. The other, Pierre Labuscaigne, escaped to Switzerland, and then moved on to the Netherlands where he married the Huguenot daughter, Marie Ann Bacoth, with whom he had several children. The family lived in Toren Street in the town of Enkhuizen. Pierre Labuscaigne's profession was listed as master tailor.

Migration 
In 1710 Pierre Labuscaigne entered into the service of the Dutch East India Company as 'Tamboerine" aboard the ship "Verbergh", and embarked for the orient. This was during the War of Spanish Succession, which made it a very perilous time to travel. During the voyage, two of the fleet of eight VOC ships were attacked by corsairs and lost. With the convoy scattered and in apparent disarray, Pierre Labuscaigne's ship, the "Verbergh", was the last of the convoy to reach the Cape of Good Hope. Here Pierre was left behind, as he proved to be too sick to continue the voyage.

Still under contract of service to the VOC, Pierre was then indentured to a succession of local families as a private school master, and later became sexton of the fledgling Drakenstein congregation. Upon his release from his VOC contract, he sent for his wife and children, who joined him ten years after his original departure from Holland. Pierre purchased a portion of land and named it Pontac, after the feudal lord of the region of his origin in France, the Duke of Pontacq.

The family eventually migrated to the Eastern Cape border region in the present-day region of Cradock where the family featured in the Slagtersnek rebellion. The majority of the family left the Eastern Cape during the Great Trek, starting in 1836, and migrated to places of resettlement, most notably in the Transvaal and Free State, as well as Natal. Some of the Labuschagne families fought in the Battle of Vegkop as well as the Battle of Blood River in 1838.

Present day location 
Today the Labuschagne family name can be found in countries around the world. As far as could be established, all family members of this name world-wide descend from one progenitor only, Pierre Labuscaigne. Of the Labuscaigne family members in France, no other name-bearing descendants appear to have survived to the present age.

Spelling 
The family name has experienced minor variation in spelling over the past 300 years. In modern times, the variations that dominate are Labuschagne and Labuscagne.

Pronunciation
The name is commonly pronounced  in South Africa, although the pronunciation  is also used. 

Memorial

The Labuschagne Family Union unveiled a memorial to commemorate the founding of the Labuschagne family at the Cape in 2011. The stone was laid at the Pontac Manor Hotel in Paarl. Upon change of ownership, the stone had to be moved in 2015 to its present location at the Huguenot Memorial Museum in Franschhoek.

References